Proximedia Group is a Belgian media group.

History 
Proximedia Belgium was founded in 1998 by Fabrice Wuyts and Eric Glachant. The company specialized in providing websites for SMEs. The Proximedia Group SA was founded in 1999 and became the coordinating organization of Proximedia Belgium, Online, Bizbook Channel, Globule Bleu bvba, Click+, Proximedia France, Proximedia Nederland, and Proximedia Spain. The Proximedia Group has been listed at the Free Market of Euronext Brussels since 2005. In 2007, the Proximedia Group founded the Bizbook Channel. This branch specialized in creating corporate videos. In 2008, Proximedia SA took over the web agency Globule Bleu. The following year, Proximedia launched the brand BeUP. They were also elected ‘Enterprise of The Year 2009’ by Ernst & Young. Proximedia launched two new services in 2011: Videobiz and Promobook. In 2012, the Bizbook Channel was launched. Proximedia was acquired by Publicis Groupe S.A. in July 2014.

Branches 
 Proximedia Belgium: the oldest branch of the Proximedia Group. It makes websites and provide support for their customers. Similar branches are Proximedia France and Proximedia Nederland.
 Batibouw +: specialised in bringing contractors and clients together.
 Bizbook Channel: specialised in creating corporate videos for SMEs.
Click+: offers the management of Google Adwords campaigns. This contains advertising in Google's search results.
 Globule Bleu: specialised in digital campaigns for larger companies or organisations.
 Online: an Internet Service Provider (ISP) that provides internet access, domain names, hosting of websites and data centers, email service, etc.
 Bizbook: an online guestbook where users can post reviews on the products and services of a company.
 Promobook: an online service which can be used to print promotions and coupons.

Key figures

References

External links 
 
 Echo: Proximedia op Euronext Brussel
 Bizbook.be

Digital media
Mass media companies of Belgium
Companies based in Brussels